Alton Crafton (born 17 December 1969) is a Saint Lucian cricketer. He played in eight first-class and nineteen List A matches for the Windward Islands from 1991 to 2003.

See also
 List of Windward Islands first-class cricketers

References

External links
 

1969 births
Living people
Saint Lucian cricketers
Windward Islands cricketers